The 1861 Wisconsin gubernatorial election was held on November 5, 1861. Republican Party candidate Louis P. Harvey won the election with 54% of the vote, defeating Democratic candidate Benjamin Ferguson.

This was the first Wisconsin gubernatorial election to take place after the outbreak of the American Civil War, and Wisconsin Republicans reorganized under the Union Party banner during the war.  Democrats accused them of using patriotism to paper over the state's economic troubles.

Wisconsin in 1861

Wisconsin was experiencing economic depression, the results of the Panic of 1857.  The secession of the southern states was further damage to the economy, exacerbating problems in the state's banks, which had invested a great deal of capital in southern bonds.  The bonds were essentially worthless after secession, and thirty eight banks had failed by June 1861, with another forty on the brink.  Riots broke out over invalidated bank notes and soldiers had to be called in to restore order. 

The farm economy was also depressed, as prices for agricultural products fell due to the Confederate blockade on the Mississippi River.  Railroad companies took advantage of their new monopoly on transportation and raised their freight prices.  The combination of low incomes and higher expenses pushed many farms toward foreclosure.

All of these problems weighed heavily on the government, and the Republicans, who held power in the state at the time, took much of the blame for bringing depression and war.  It was in this environment that incumbent Republican Governor Alexander Randall chose not to seek re-election to a third term.

Democratic Party
Benjamin Ferguson was a member of the Wisconsin State Senate at the time of the election, representing Dodge County.  Ferguson was a farmer and had previously been elected Sheriff of Dodge County and served on the County Board of Supervisors.

Republican (Union) Party
Louis P. Harvey was the incumbent Wisconsin Secretary of State at the time of the 1861 election, having been elected in the 1859 election.  He had previously served two terms in the Wisconsin State Senate, representing Rock County.  Harvey was a former Whig who had participated in the founding and organization of the Republican Party of Wisconsin.

Results

| colspan="6" style="text-align:center;background-color: #e9e9e9;"| General Election, November 5, 1861

References

1861
1861 Wisconsin elections
Wisconsin